Hymenopappus flavomarginatus is a North American species of flowering plant in the daisy family.

It grows in northern Mexico, in the states of Nuevo León, Coahuila, and San Luis Potosí.

Description
It has very narrow divided leaves, resembling branching threads.

Each plant produces numerous flower heads in a flat-topped cluster, each head with 40-50 yellow disc flowers but no ray flowers.

References

External links
Photo of herbarium specimen collected in Nuevo León in 2003

flavomarginatus
Endemic flora of Mexico
Flora of Coahuila
Flora of Nuevo León
Flora of San Luis Potosí
Plants described in 1923